Hairuddin Bin Omar (born 29 September 1979) also known as Hai-O is a Malaysian former international football player. He spent most of his career as a forward but can also play as a midfielder.

Club career
Born and raised in Setiu, 70 kilometres from Kuala Terengganu, Hairuddin began his football career with Terengganu and made his professional season debut playing for Terengganu in 1999. He helped his team win the Malaysia Cup in 2001. After 4 seasons playing for his hometown team he signed a contract with Pahang in 2003.

Hairuddin was part of the Pahang team that won the 2004 Malaysia Super League title and later clinched the Malaysia FA Cup title in 2006. After 6 years spending his career with Pahang, Hairuddin returned to his hometown and signed a contract with a Kuala Terengganu-based football club, T-Team. During the Malaysia Cup campaign in 2009, he was loaned to Negeri Sembilan until the end of the Malaysia Cup campaign. On 7 November 2009, Negeri Sembilan secured the 2009 Malaysia Cup title in a 1–3 win over Kelantan and scored 1 goal in that match.

In 2010, Hairuddin signed a one-year contract with Kelantan. While playing for the team, he won the 2010 Malaysia Cup and scored 1 goal in a 2–1 win in the final against Negeri Sembilan on 30 October 2010 at the Bukit Jalil National Stadium.

After his contract with Kelantan ended, Hairuddin signed a one-year contract with Negeri Sembilan in 2011. He made 19 appearances and 4 goals in the league campaign. During the 2011 Malaysia Cup, Hairuddin scored 8 goals to claim the tournament's golden boot, including the winning goal in a 2–1 win over Terengganu in the final. That was Hairuddin's third straight Malaysia Cup title since 2009.

In 2012, Hairuddin signed a contract with Malaysian Armed Forces for the 2012 Malaysia Premier League season and was appointed as the captain of the team. Hairuddin spent 4 years with the club before leaving for Terengganu in 2016. While playing for Armed Forces, Hairuddin led the team into winning the 2012 Malaysia Premier League title, 2012 Malaysia Cup title and won the Sultan Haji Ahmad Shah Cup in 2013.

Hairuddin returned to Terengganu in 2016 after he refused to extend his contract with Armed Forces for another year. He signed a one-year contract with the team.

In February 2017, Hairuddin announced his retirement at club and international level.

On 4 January 2020, Hairuddin came out from his retirement to play for a social football club, U.C Viching. He provided an assist despite losing 3-1 in that match.

Since 2013, Hairuddin is also the president of the Professional Footballers Association of Malaysia.

International career

Hairuddin earned 54 caps, scoring 13 goals for the Malaysia national team from 2000 to 2009. He represented Malaysia at 3 AFF Championship in 2002, 2007 and 2008, 2007 Asian Cup and also 2001 Southeast Asian Games and 2002 Asian Games for the national under 23 team.

On 25 July 2003, Hairuddin earned the distinction of scoring Malaysia's solitary goal in the 4–1 defeat to Chelsea in FA Premier League Asia Cup 2003, an invitational tournament in 2003. Then he out-jumped England international John Terry to nod the ball home off a swerving corner kick from his Terengganu teammate, Rosdi Talib, four minutes after Frank Lampard had opened the scoring in the 36th minute.
It was as a result of a well-worked set-piece the boys managed to translate into the game, giving the nation the first goal against an English opponent since Matlan Marjan's double against England at Merdeka Stadium in 1991.

Managerial career

In August 2017, Hairuddin was appointed as the Malaysia national under-19 team assistant head coach working along with Bojan Hodak.

Career statistics

International

International goals

Honours

Club
Terengganu
 Malaysia Cup: 2001

Pahang
 Malaysia Super League: 2004
 Malaysia FA Cup: 2006

Negeri Sembilan
 Malaysia Cup: 2009, 2011

Kelantan
 Malaysia Cup: 2010

Angkatan Tentera Malaysia
 Malaysia Premier League: 2012

International
Malaysia U-23

 SEA Games :  Silver 2001

References

External links
 
 

1979 births
Living people
Malaysian people of Malay descent
Malaysian footballers
Malaysia international footballers
2007 AFC Asian Cup players
People from Terengganu
Kelantan FA players
Terengganu FC players
Negeri Sembilan FA players
Sri Pahang FC players
Terengganu F.C. II players
ATM FA players
Malaysia Super League players
Association football forwards
Association football midfielders
Footballers at the 2002 Asian Games
Asian Games competitors for Malaysia